The 2022 Newcastle-under-Lyme Borough Council election took place on 5 May 2022 to elect members of Newcastle-under-Lyme Borough Council in England. It was held on the same day as other local elections.

Elections in 2018 left the council in no overall control, but the Conservatives were defending a majority on the council after taking control through defections in 2021.

Summary

Election result

|-

Results by ward

Audley

 
Ian Wilkes was elected in 2018 as a Liberal Democrat.

Bradwell

Clayton

Crackley & Red Street

Cross Heath

Holditch & Chesterton

 
Ken Owen was elected at a 2019 by-election as an Independent.

Keele

Kidsgrove & Ravenscliffe

Knutton

 
Derrick Huckfield had been elected in a by-election.

Loggerheads

Madeley & Betley

 
Simon White and Gary White were elected in 2018 as Independents.

Maer & Whitmore

May Bank

Newchapel & Mow Cop

Silverdale

Talke & Butt Lane

Thistleberry

Town

Westbury Park & Northwood

Westlands

Wolstanton

References

Newcastle-under-Lyme Borough Council elections
Newcastle-under-Lyme
2020s in Staffordshire